Endeavor Group Holdings may refer to:

Endeavor (company), media company in the United States
Endeavour Group, alcohol retailer in Australia